Adolf Paul Johannes Althaus (29 November 1861 – 9 April 1925) was a German Lutheran theologian, born in Fallersleben (17 m. n.e. of Brunswick). He was a professor at the universities of Göttingen and Leipzig since 1897. He was the father of Paul Althaus (1888–1966). He died in Leipzig.

Works (selection) 
Die historische und dogmatische Grundlage der lutherischen Taufliturgie [The Historical and Dogmatic Foundation of the Lutheran Liturgy of Baptism], 1893
Die Heilsbedeutung der Taufe im Neuen Testament [The Sacred Meaning of Baptism in the New Testament], 1897
Frömmigkeit und Sittlichkeit nach evangelischer Auffassung [Piety and Morality from an Evangelical Point of View], 1906
Luther als der Vater des evangelischen Kirchenliedes [Luther, the Father of the Evangelical Hymn], 1917

References

German Lutheran theologians
1861 births
1925 deaths
20th-century German Protestant theologians
German male non-fiction writers